The Glasgow Subway rolling stock serves the Glasgow Subway, the third-oldest underground metro system in the world. The Subway is currently on the 2nd generation of rolling stock, with a 3rd generation ordered and expected to enter service in 2023. Unlike other Metro systems in the United Kingdom, the Subway has a running gauge of 1,220 mm (approximately 4 ft).

First generation (1896–1977)
The first rolling stock was largely built in 1896, with additional trailer carriages added over the following 19 years. This rolling stock was converted from cable to electric traction in 1935 and finally withdrawn from service in 1977 upon the closure of the railway for modernisation.

Second generation (1980–2023)
The first 33 cars of the current rolling stock was built by Metro-Cammell, Washwood Heath between 1977 and 1979. Eight additional trailer cars were built in 1992. The rolling stock entered service when the subway re-opened after modernisation work on 16 April 1980. The original 33 were refurbished by ABB at Derby Litchurch Lane Works in 1995.

Livery
Originally after the 1977–1980 modernisation the trains carried a light orange livery with a white stripe and stylised 'Trans-Clyde' branding. However soon the rolling stock were all painted in a darker orange or 'Strathclyde red'. Various minor adjustments to livery were made, including new SPT branding. The trains were given a totally new livery in 2006 when they were painted 'Cream & Carmine'. However, in 2011 it was decided to return to an orange livery for the foreseeable future; this new orange design incorporates patches of white and grey to give the rolling stock a more modern look.

Some trains carry special liveries for advertising. These are normally found on the middle carriage on a train. These carriages are normally given a wrap in the design for the advert intended and are then used for the period of sponsorship; these wraps can then be removed and the subway carriage can use its orange livery.

Third generation (2023)

Strathclyde Partnership for Transport (SPT) unveiled a £200M contract with Stadler and Ansaldo STS in 2016 for modernisation of the Subway, including new rolling stock. These trains were expected to enter service after the modernisation is complete in 2020; however they have not yet entered service. These new trains are now expected to enter service in 2023. The trains are being built by Stadler Rail at their factory in Altenrhein in eastern Switzerland.

Seventeen new trains will be built: these will feature the potential for driverless operation, as well as wider gangways for wheelchairs, and compatibility with platform screen doors. The new trains will be the same length and size as the current trains, but will be made up of 4 carriages rather than the present 3. The new trains were first shown to the public at InnoTrans in 2018. The first was delivered in May 2019.

References

Glasgow Subway
Electric multiple units of Great Britain
Lists of rolling stock
600 V DC multiple units